Harry A. Bridgeman Sr. (May 31, 1877 – May 15, 1955) was an American locomotive engineer and politician.

Early life 
Bridgeman was born near Motley, Minnesota, and attended Minnesota public schools.

Career 
Outside of politics, Bridgeman worked as a locomotive engineer for Minnesota and International Railway. Bridgeman served on the Bemidji City Council for two years. He then served in the Minnesota Senate from 1929 to 1950.

Personal life 
Bridgeman lived in Bemidji, Minnesota, with his wife and family. He moved to Hot Springs, Arkansas, in 1951. Bridgeman died at the Northern Pacific Railroad Hospital in Saint Paul, Minnesota.

References

1877 births
1955 deaths
People from Bemidji, Minnesota
People from Motley, Minnesota
American locomotive engineers
Minnesota city council members
Minnesota state senators
Minnesota Independents